Puerto Seco Airstrip  is an airstrip serving the town of Discovery Bay in the Saint Ann Parish of Jamaica.

Northeast approach and departure are over the Caribbean.

See also

Transport in Jamaica
List of airports in Jamaica

References

External links
OpenStreetMap - Discovery Bay
HERE Maps - Puerto Seco Airstrip

Airports in Jamaica